The men's horizontal bar event at the 2020 Summer Olympics was held on 24 July and 3 August 2021 at the Ariake Gymnastics Centre. Approximately 70 gymnasts from 35 nations (of the 98 total gymnasts) competed on the horizontal bar in the qualifying round.

Japan's Daiki Hashimoto won the event to earn his second title of the 2020 Olympics and third Olympic medal overall. Tin Srbić of Croatia took silver for his first Olympic medal. ROC's Nikita Nagornyy finished with the bronze, his second individual bronze and fourth Olympic medal overall. None of the 2016 medalists entered the event as they all retired from competitions.

Background
This was the 25th appearance of the event, which is one of the five apparatus events held every time there were apparatus events at the Summer Olympics (no apparatus events were held in 1900, 1908, 1912, or 1920).

Qualification

A National Olympic Committee (NOC) could enter up to 6 qualified gymnasts: a team of 4 and up to 2 specialists. A total of 98 quota places are allocated to men's gymnastics.

The 12 teams that qualify will be able to send 4 gymnasts in the team competition, for a total of 48 of the 98 quota places. The top three teams at the 2018 World Artistic Gymnastics Championships (China, Russia, and Japan) and the top nine teams (excluding those already qualified) at the 2019 World Artistic Gymnastics Championships (Ukraine, Great Britain, Switzerland, the United States, Chinese Taipei, South Korea, Brazil, Spain, and Germany) earned team qualification places.

The remaining 50 quota places are awarded individually. Each gymnast can only earn one place, except that gymnasts that competed with a team that qualified are eligible to earn a second place through the 2020 All Around World Cup Series. Some of the individual events are open to gymnasts from NOCs with qualified teams, while others are not. These places are filled through various criteria based on the 2019 World Championships, the 2020 FIG Artistic Gymnastics World Cup series, continental championships, a host guarantee, and a Tripartite Commission invitation. 

Each of the 98 qualified gymnasts are eligible for the pommel horse competition, but many gymnasts do not compete in each of the apparatus events.

The COVID-19 pandemic delayed many of the events for qualifying for gymnastics. The 2018 and 2019 World Championships were completed on time, but many of the World Cup series events were delayed into 2021.

Competition format
The top 8 qualifiers in the qualification phase (limit two per NOC) advance to the apparatus final. The finalists perform an additional exercise. Qualification scores are then ignored, with only final round scores counting.

Schedule
The competition is held over two days, 24 July and 3 August. The qualifying round (for all men's gymnastics events) is the first day; the apparatus final is on the second day.

Results

Qualifying 

 Reserves
The reserves for the men's horizontal bar final were:
 
 
 

Only two gymnasts from each country may advance to the event final. No gymnasts were excluded from the final or as reserves because of the quota.

Final

References

Men's horizontal bar
2020
Men's 2020
Men's events at the 2020 Summer Olympics